Leigh Michaels is the pseudonym used by LeAnn Lemberger (born July 27, 1954 in Iowa, United States), a popular United States writer of over 80 romance novels. She published her novels in Harlequin Enterprises Ltd since 1984 to 2006. She also teaches romance writing for Gothan Writers' Workshop among other places.

Biography
LeAnn was born on July 27, 1954 in Iowa, United States. She received a Bachelor of Arts in journalism from Drake University in Des Moines, Iowa, after three years of study and maintained a 3.93 grade-point average. She received the Robert Bliss Award as top-ranking senior in the School of Journalism and Mass Communication, and won a national William Randolph Hearst Award for feature-writing as an undergraduate.

When LeAnn was very young she read romance novels, and when she was fifteen, she wrote her first romance novel and burned it. She burned five more complete manuscripts before submitting one to a publisher. The first submission was accepted by Harlequin Enterprises, the only publisher to look at it, and was published in 1984 under the pseudonym Leigh Michaels (her husband name).

LeAnn married to Michael W. Lemberger, an artist-photographer.

Awards
Ties That Bind: Finalist for Best Traditional Romance novel in the RITA Award by Romance Writers of America.
The Lake Effect: Finalist for Best Traditional Romance novel in the RITA Award by Romance Writers of America.
Traveling Man: Finalist for Best Traditional Romance novel in the RITA Award by Romance Writers of America.
The Unlikely Santa: Finalist for Best Traditional Romance novel in the RITA Award by Romance Writers of America.
The Daddy Trap: Finalist for Best Traditional Romance novel in the RITA Award by Romance Writers of America.

Bibliography

Single Novels
Wednesday's Child (1985)
Deadline for Love (1985)
Come Next Summer (1985)
Dreams to Keep (1985)
Leaving Home (1985)
Capture a Shadow (1986)
Brittany's Castle (1986)
Carlisle Pride (1987)
Rebel with a Cause (1987)
Strictly Business (1987)
Close Collaboration (1988)
Just a Normal Marriage (1988)
Shades of Yesterday (1988)
Let Me Count the Ways (1988)
With No Reservations (1989)
An Imperfect Love (1990)
Promise Me Tomorrow (1990)
Temporary Measures (1991)
Old School Ties (1992)
The Lake Effect (1993)
Safe in My Heart (1993)
Ties That Blind (1993)
House of Dreams (1994)
The Only Solution (1994)
A Singular Honeymoon (1994)
Traveling Man (1994)
Marrying the Boss! (1996)
Dialogue Ain't Cheap (1998)
The Men in My Life (1998)
The Problem with Conflict (1998)
Her Husband to Be (1999)
Unraveling the Romance (1999)
Tempting a Tycoon (1999)
His Trophy Wife (2001)
Backwards Honeymoon (2001)
The Bride Assignment (2003)
Assignment: Twins (2004)
The Tycoon's Proposal (2006)

Logan Brothers Series
The Grand Hotel (1984)
Touch Not My Heart (1985)

Springhill Series
Sell Me a Dream (1986)
Once and for Always (1989)
An Uncommon Affair (1990)
The Best Made Plans (1992)
Family Secrets (1994)

Tyler-Royalel Series
O'Hara's Legacy (1986)
A New Desire (1988)
The Unlikely Santa (1995)

McKenna Family Series
No Place Like Home (1988)
A Matter of Principal (1989)
Garrett's Back in Town (1991)
The Unexpected Landlord (1992)
Dating Games (1993)

San Valentin! Series
The Perfect Divorce! (1997)
The Fake Fiance! (1997)

Finding Mr. Right Series
The Billionaire Date (1998)
The Playboy Assignment (1998)
The Husband Project (1998)

Hiring Ms. Right Series
Husband on Demand (2000)
Bride on Loan (2000)
Wife on Approval (2000)

Men: Made in America Series Multi-Author
15. Kiss Yesterday Goodbye (1984)

American Heroes: Against All Odds Series Multi-Author
15. Exclusively Yours (1988)

Sealed with a Kiss Series Multi-Author
Invitation to Love (1994)

Kids & Kisses Series Multi-Author
Family Secrets (1994)

Pages & Privileges Series Multi-Author
Taming a Tycoon (1995)

Holding Out for a Hero Series Multi-Author
The Only Man for Maggie (1996)
The Daddy Trap (1996)

Baby Boom Series Multi-Author
Baby You're Mine! (1997)

Marrying the Boss Series Multi-Author
The Boss and the Baby (1999)
The Corporate Wife (2000)

Daddy Boom Series Multi-Author
The Tycoon's Baby (1999)

Nearlyweds Series Multi-Author
The Bridal Swap (1999)

A Walk Down the Aisle: Wedding Celebration Series Multi-Author
A Convenient Affair (2001)

Contract Brides Series Multi-Author
Bride by Design (2002)

To Have and To Hold Series Multi-Author
Maybe Married (2002)

Nine To Five Serie Multi-Author
The Boss's Daughter (2002)
The Marriage Market (2003)
The Billionaire Bid (2003)
The Corporate Marriage Campaign (2005)

What Women Want Series Multi-Author
Part-time Fiance (2003)
The Takeover Bid (2003)
The Husband Sweepstake (2004)

Collections
Why Can't a Woman Be More Like a Man? (2006)

Omnibus In Collaboration
My Valentine (1992) (with Katherine Arthur, Debbie Macomber and Peggy Nicholson)
A Man for Mum: Four Stories in One (1999) (with Penny Jordan)
Mothers-to-be (1999) (with Emma Darcy and Lynne Graham)
A Tender Christmas (2000) (with Liz Fielding and Emma Goldrick)
Switched at the Altar (2001) (with Miranda Lee, Susan Napier and Rebecca Winters)
Bachelors' Babies (2001) (with Lynne Graham and Sharon Kendrick)
Temporary Santa (2003) (with Cathy Gillen Thacker)
Billionaire Grooms (2006) (with Emma Darcy and Sara Wood)
Bewitched by the Boss (2006) (with Alison Fraser and Charlotte Lamb)

Non fiction
Writing the Romance Novel (1996)
A Taste of Love (1998)
Writing the Romance Novel: Updated (1999)
Creating Romantic Characters: Bringing Life to Your Romance Novel (2002)
On Writing Romance: How to Craft a Novel That Sells (2007)

References and Resources

Leigh Michaels's Official Website
Harlequin Enterprises Ltd

External links
Papers of LeAnn Lemberger, a Manuscript Collection held by the Special Collections Department, University of Iowa Libraries

American romantic fiction writers
Living people
1954 births
American women writers
Writers from Iowa
Women romantic fiction writers
21st-century American women